Georges Jean Penabert (1825–1903) was a French photographer.

Biography 
He remained in 1869 at 31 Passage du Havre in the 9th arrondissement in Paris. His declared profession for that year is a trader (photographer). He was born in Arudy (Basses Pyrénées, today Pyrénées-Atlantiques), April 23, 1825. He is the son of Pierre Penabert, died in Viamão (Brazil) in 1836 and Anne Dibat, died in Porto Alegre (Brazil), October 13, 1848. He is a widower of Héloïse Valentine Déot, who died in New York City (United States) on March 9, 1855 as a result of her delivery. Married in second marriage on April 8, 1869 in Paris in the 17th arrondissement with Marie Adélaïde Gaillant, widow of Jean Vigoureux. Marriage contract with Maître Baudrier, notary in Paris, April 6, 1869. One of the witnesses at the wedding, Paul Delamain (1821–1882), painter, French orientalist, student of Leblanc and Michel Martin Drolling. Georges Penabert has a daughter born of the first marriage, Héloïse (Eloise) Valentine Penabert born in New York (United States) March 2, 1855. She married in Paris in the 9th arrondissement, Eugene Joseph Desfossé, October 21, 1875. Marriage contract with Maître Laverne, notary in Paris, October 16, 1875. She is declared as a minor daughter of Georges Penabert, photographer. Penabert began its activity in 1858 in Paris, under the name Penabert et Cie; he practices at various addresses: 46 rue Basse du Rempart, 31 passage of Le Havre around 1864, 36/38 passage of Le Havre in 1875. It opens two branches, 587 Broadway in New York and 108 Calle de la Havana in Cuba. He became associated with Charles DeForest Fredricks (1823–1894) and his work was awarded a Silver Medal at the Paris World Fair in 1889. Georges Penabert died in Paris in the 11th district on December 27, 1903, at the age of 78 years.

Gallery

References 

  Marc Durand, De l'image fixe à l'image animée (1820–1910, actes des notaires de Paris pour servir à l'histoire des photographes et de la photographie .Éditions des Archives nationales (France), Pierrefitte-sur-Seine, 2015, volumes 1 et 2, 600 et 723 pages.
  David Karel, Dictionnaire des artistes de langue française en Amérique du Nord : peintres, sculpteurs, dessinateurs, graveurs, photographes, et orfèvres. Éditions Presses de l'Université Laval, Québec (ville), 1er septembre 1992, 962 pages.

External links 

  Georges Penabert page on Bibliothèque nationale de France

1825 births
1903 deaths
19th-century French photographers
19th-century French people